USS Adhara (AK-71) was a  in the service of the US Navy in the Pacific theater in World War II. Named after the star Adhara in the constellation Canis Major, it was the only ship of the Navy to bear this name.

Construction
Adhara was laid down 16 September 1942 as liberty ship SS G. H. Corliss under a Maritime Commission (MARCOM) contract, MC hull 425, by Permanente Metals Corporation, Yard No. 2, Richmond, California; launched on 27 October 1942; sponsored by Miss Ginny Simms, the lead vocalist for Kay Kyser's orchestra; acquired by the Navy on 6 November 1942; renamed Adhara (AK-71); and commissioned on 16 November 1942.

Service history
Adhara sailed from San Francisco, on 27 November bound for the South Pacific. For the next eight months, she served as a member of Service Squadron (ServRon) 8 transporting cargo and passengers between the ports of Tutuila, Samoa; Efate, New Hebrides; Espiritu Santo; Guadalcanal; Tulagi; Nouméa, New Caledonia; and Wellington, New Zealand.

While at Guadalcanal on 7 April 1943, Adhara was among several ships subjected to a Japanese air attack. Five bombs exploded close aboard Adhara and punctured her hull in three places. The ship received jury patching at Espiritu Santo and then steamed to Australia for repairs.

After emerging from dry dock at Wellington, Adhara got underway for the west coast of the United States and on 10 July entered the Mare Island Navy Yard, Vallejo, California. When again ready for action, she sailed on 6 September for the South Pacific. Upon arrival at Nouméa, the cargo ship rejoined ServRon 8 and once more served as an inter-island transport. Her labors took her to the Treasury Islands; the Russell Islands; Emirau, Green Islands; and to various ports in New Guinea, New Hebrides, New Georgia, the Admiralty Islands, Guam, Tinian, Saipan, and Eniwetok. The ship served at Okinawa from 8 to 27 May during the fighting for that island.

Decommissioning
Following Japan's capitulation in mid-August, Adhara arrived at Seattle, Washington, on 30 August and remained in availability there through 27 September. She then got underway for the east coast of the United States. The ship paused in the Norfolk Naval Shipyard to have her naval equipment removed and then continued on to Baltimore, Maryland, where she arrived on 21 November. Adhara was decommissioned on 7 December 1945, and returned to MARCOM on 11 December 1945. Her name was struck from the Navy list on 3 January 1946.

Final disposition
Adhara was laid up in the National Defense Reserve Fleet, James River Group, Virginia.

The ship resumed her former name, G. H. Corliss, and carried it until she was sold for scrap on 26 October 1971, to Hierros Ardes, S.A., a Spanish firm, for $71,520. They took delivery of the vessel almost a month later, on 23 November 1971.

Awards
Adhara won two battle stars for her World War II service.

References

Bibliography

External links

 

Crater-class cargo ships
World War II auxiliary ships of the United States
Ships built in Richmond, California
1942 ships
James River Reserve Fleet